"Break a leg" is a typical English idiom used in the context of theatre or other performing arts to wish a performer "good luck". An ironic or non-literal saying of uncertain origin (a dead metaphor), "break a leg" is commonly said to actors and musicians before they go on stage to perform or before an audition. Though the term likely originates in German, the English expression is first attributed in the 1930s or possibly 1920s, originally documented without specifically theatrical associations. Among professional dancers, the traditional saying is not "break a leg", but the French word "merde".

Non-theatrical origins

Yiddish-German pun theory
Most commonly favored as a credible theory by etymologists and other scholars, the term was possibly a loan translation from the German phrase , literally "neck and leg(bone) break", itself a loan translation from, and pun on, a Yiddish phrase, a wish for good luck, because of the Yiddish phrase's humorously similar pronunciation to the unrelated German phrase. For example, Luftwaffe pilots are reported as using the phrase  to wish each other luck. The German-language term continues to mean "good luck" but is still not specific to the theatre.

Superstition theory
The urbane Irish nationalist Robert Wilson Lynd published an article, "A Defence of Superstition", in the 1 October 1921 edition of the New Statesman, a British liberal political and cultural magazine, regarding the theatre as the second-most superstitious institution in England, after horse racing. In horse racing, Lynd asserted that to wish a man luck is considered unlucky and so "You should say something insulting such as, 'May you break your leg! Thus, the expression could reflect a now-forgotten superstition (perhaps a theatrical superstition, though Lynd's 1921 mention is non-theatrical) in which directly wishing a person "good luck" would be considered bad luck, therefore an alternative way of wishing luck was employed. Lynd did not attribute the phrase in any way to theatre people, but he was familiar with many of them and frequently mingled with actors backstage.

Theatrical origins
The aforementioned theory regarding , a German saying via Yiddish origins, suggests that the term transferred from German aviation to German society at large and then, as early as the 1920s, into the American (or British and then American) theatre. The English translation of the term is probably explained by German-speaking Jewish immigrants entering the American entertainment industry after the First World War. The alternative theory that the term reflects an ironic superstition would date the term as originating around the same time.

The earliest published example in writing specifically within a theatre context comes from American writer Edna Ferber's 1939 autobiography A Peculiar Treasure, in which she writes about the fascination in the theatre of "all the understudies sitting in the back row politely wishing the various principals would break a leg." American playwright Bernard Sobel's 1948 The Theatre Handbook and Digest of Plays describes theatrical superstitions: "before a performance actors never wish each other good luck, but say 'I hope you break a leg. There is some anecdotal evidence from theatrical memoirs and personal letters as early as the 1920s.

Other popular but implausible theories
The performer bowing: The term "break a leg" may refer to a performer bowing or curtsying to the audience in the metaphorical sense of bending one's leg to do so.
The performer breaking the leg line: The edge of a stage just beyond the vantage point of the audience forms a line, imaginary or actually marked, that can be referred to as the "leg line," named after a type of concealing stage curtain: a leg. For an unpaid stand-by performer to cross or "break" this line would mean that the performer was getting an opportunity to go onstage and be paid; therefore, "break a leg" might have shifted from a specific hope for this outcome to a general hope for any performer's good fortune. Even less plausible, the saying could originally express the hope that an enthusiastic audience repeatedly calls for further bows or encores. This might cause a performer to repeatedly "break" the leg line, or, alternatively, it might even cause the leg curtains themselves to break from overuse.
Alluding to David Garrick: During a performance of Shakespeare's Richard III, the famed 18th-century British actor David Garrick became so entranced in the performance that he was supposedly unaware of a literal fracture in his leg.
The audience breaking legs: Various folk-theories propose that Elizabethan or even Ancient Greek theatrical audiences either stomped their literal legs or banged chair legs to express applause.
Alluding to John Wilkes Booth: One popular but false etymology derives the phrase from the 1865 assassination of Abraham Lincoln, during which John Wilkes Booth, the actor-turned-assassin, claimed in his diary that he broke his leg leaping to the stage of Ford's Theatre after murdering the president. The fact that actors did not start wishing each other to "break a leg" until as early as the 1920s (more than 50 years later) makes this an unlikely source. Furthermore, Booth often exaggerated and falsified his diary entries to make them more dramatic.

Alternative meanings
There is an older, likely unrelated meaning of "break a leg" going back to the 17th and 18th centuries that refers to having "a bastard / natural child."

Alternative terms
Professional dancers do not wish each other good luck by saying "break a leg;" instead they say "Merde!", the French word for "shit". In turn, theater people have picked up this usage and may wish each other "merde," alone or in combination with "break a leg." In Spanish, the phrase is "mucha mierda," or "lots of shit." In Portuguese, it's "muita merda," with the same meaning. This term refers to the times when carriages would take the audience to the theatre. A quick look to the street in front of the venue would tell if the play was successful: a lot of horse dung would mean many carriages had stopped to leave spectators.

Opera singers use "Toi toi toi," an idiom used to ward off a spell or hex, often accompanied by knocking on wood, and onomatopoeic, spitting (or imitating the sound of spitting). Saliva traditionally was supposed to have demon-banishing powers. From Rotwelsch tof, from Yiddish tov ("good," derived from the Hebrew טוב and with phonetic similarities to the Old German word for "Devil"). One explanation sees "toi toi toi" as the onomatopoeic rendition of spitting three times.  Spitting three times over someone's head or shoulder is a gesture to ward off evil spirits. A similar-sounding expression for verbal spitting occurs in modern Hebrew as "Tfu, tfu" (here, only twice), which some say that Hebrew-speakers borrowed from Russian.

An alternate operatic good luck charm, originating from Italy, is the phrase "in bocca al lupo!" ("In the mouth of the wolf") with the response "Crepi il lupo!" ("May the wolf die")
(see Standard Dictionary of Folklore, Myth & Legend).

In Australia, the term "chookas" has been used also. According to one oral tradition, one of the company would check audience numbers. If there were not many in the seats, the performers would have bread to eat following the performance. If the theatre was full they could then have "chook" —Australian slang for chicken— for dinner. Therefore, if it was a full house, the performer would call out "Chook it is!", which became abbreviated to "Chookas!" It is now used by performers prior to a show regardless of the number of patrons; and may be a wish for a successful turnout.

In Russian, a similar tradition existed for hunters, with one being told "" (romanized: Ni pukha, ni pera, "Neither fur nor feather") before the hunt, with the reply being "" (romanized: K chiortu, "Go to hell"). Today, this exchange is customary for students before an exam.

In popular culture
The 2001 Broadway musical comedy The Producers features a song titled "It's Bad Luck To Say 'Good Luck' On Opening Night," in which the novice producer Leo Bloom is instructed that the proper way to wish someone good luck on Broadway is to say "Break a leg." Moments later, the show's star is seen to break his leg—preventing him from performing—and in a later scene he breaks his other leg. The number also appears in the 2005 film version of the musical.

See also
 Knocking on wood
 Spilling water for luck
 The Scottish play
 Thespis

References

Macerena, Vintage.(2019).”The theories and origins of nonsense and tomfoolery in the modern age". Journal of Cultural Reference. Pg 134–136.

External links

 Break a Leg – Glossary of Technical Theatre Terms (With many explanations as to the origins of the term)
 Break a Leg, and Other Good Wishes, by Matthew Alice, in the San Diego Reader.
 Break a Leg by Gary Martin, phrases.org.uk, 1996 – 2006.
 Resource on Ortaoyunu

Theatre
Stage terminology
Superstitions
English-language idioms